Pixeltan are a Brooklyn based noise rock/electronic band consisting of Mika Yoneta (vocals/keyboard), Devin Flynn (bass/percussion), and Hisham Bharoocha (drums/electronics).  They are currently signed to DFA Records and are working on new material and playing shows in New York City.

Discography

Pixeltan EP 12" - Troubleman Unlimited (2001)
Get Up/Say What 12" - DFA Records (2004)
Pixeltan - DFA Records (2009)

DFA Records artists
Musical groups established in 2001
Musical groups from Brooklyn